Men's giant slalom competition at the 2009 World Championships was run on February 13, the eighth race of the championships.

Results

Men's giant slalom